Feast in the House of Simon the Pharisee, also known as Christ in the Home of Simon the Pharisee, is a painting by Peter Paul Rubens. It was painted c. 1618–1620, and is in The Hermitage Museum, St. Petersburg.

The painting depicts an incident from Luke 7 where Jesus visits Simon the Pharisee, and has his feet anointed by a "sinful woman". Jesus proceeds to tell the Parable of the Two Debtors.

References

Paintings by Peter Paul Rubens
1620 paintings
Paintings depicting Jesus
Paintings in Russia
Paintings in the collection of the Hermitage Museum